Michael Golding is an American novelist. He is most noted for his 2015 novel A Poet of the Invisible World, which won the Ferro-Grumley Award and was a shortlisted finalist for the Lambda Literary Award for Gay Fiction in 2016.

An alumnus of Duke University, Golding previously published the novels Simple Prayers (1994) and Benjamin's Gift (1999), and cowrote the screenplay for the 2007 film Silk.

He came out as gay during the process of writing A Poet of the Invisible World.

References

External links

20th-century American novelists
21st-century American novelists
American male novelists
American historical novelists
American LGBT novelists
American gay writers
Duke University alumni
Living people
American screenwriters
20th-century American male writers
21st-century American male writers
Year of birth missing (living people)